The legal drinking age is the minimum age at which a person can legally consume alcoholic beverages. The minimum age alcohol can be legally consumed can be different from the age when it can be purchased in some countries. These laws vary between countries and many laws have exemptions or special circumstances. Most laws apply only to drinking alcohol in public places with alcohol consumption in the home being mostly unregulated (an exception being the UK, which has a minimum legal age of five for supervised consumption in private places). Some countries also have different age limits for different types of alcohol drinks.

The majority of countries have a minimum legal drinking age of 18. The most commonly known reason for the law behind the legal drinking age is the effect on the brain in adolescents. Since the brain is still maturing, alcohol can have a negative effect on the memory and long-term thinking. Alongside that, it can cause liver failure, and create a hormone imbalance in teens due to the constant changes and maturing of hormones during puberty. Some countries have an MLDA of 19 to prevent the flow of alcoholic beverages in high schools, while others like the United States have a minimum legal purchasing age of 21 (18 in P.R. and USVI) in an effort to reduce the amount of drunk driving rates among teenagers and young adults.

Africa
The most common minimum age to purchase alcohol in Africa is 18. However, Angola (except Luanda Province), Central African Republic, Comoros, Equatorial Guinea, Guinea-Bissau, Mali, and Togo have no laws on the books restricting the sale of alcohol to minors. In Libya, Somalia and Sudan the sale, production and consumption of alcohol is completely prohibited.

Americas
In Central America, the Caribbean, and South America the legal drinking age and legal purchase age varies from 0 to 20 years (see table below). In South America in particular, the legal purchase age is 18 years, with two exceptions:
 In Paraguay, the legal drinking age and purchase age is 20 years.
 In Guyana, minors aged 16 or 17 may consume a glass of beer or wine in a restaurant provided they buy a meal.

In North America the legal drinking age and legal purchase age varies from 18 to 21 years:
 In Mexico, the drinking age is 18 in all states.
 In the United States, the minimum legal age to purchase alcoholic beverages is 21 years of age; the two exceptions are Puerto Rico and the Virgin Islands where the age is 18. The legal drinking age varies by state.
 In Canada, most provinces have a minimum age of 19 years to buy or consume alcohol, while Alberta, Manitoba, and Quebec, the minimum age is 18 years.

In the late 20th century, much of North America changed its minimum legal drinking ages (MLDAs) as follows:

Asia

Europe

Most countries in Europe have set 18 as the minimum age to purchase alcohol. Although Austria, Belgium, Denmark, Germany, Gibraltar, Liechtenstein, Luxembourg, Malta, Serbia and Switzerland (except Ticino) maintain a minimum purchase age below 18 years, minors are permitted either full or limited access to alcohol. In 2005, 2007 and 2015 harmonization at the European Union level toward a minimum purchase age of 18 was discussed, but not agreed.

Timeline of changes to drinking/purchase age or laws restricting the access to alcohol for minors:

 In 2002 the Spanish autonomous communities Madrid, Valencia and Catalonia raised their minimum purchase age to 18 years. Previously, Valencia and Madrid had a minimum purchase age of 16 years, and in Catalonia minors aged 16 or 17 could purchase alcohol up to 23% ABV on- and off-premise.
 In 2004 Denmark raised its off-premise purchase age from 15 to 16 years.
 In November 2005 Switzerland passed its Food and Commodities Regulation (German: Lebensmittel- und Gebrauchsgegenständeverordnung), introducing a ban on alcohol sales to anyone under the age of 16. The Alcohol Law (German: Alkoholgesetz) passed in 1980 requires a minimum age of 18 years for the retail sale of distilled spirits. Therefore, it is prohibited to sell fermented alcohol (e.g. beer, wine, sparkling wine or cider) to anyone under the age of 16, and any distilled alcohol beverages to anyone under the age of 18 years. The canton of Ticino has a cantonal law since 1989 that makes the purchase age limit for all alcohol beverages 18 years.
 In 2006 the Spanish autonomous community Castile and León raised its minimum purchase age from 16 to 18 years.
 In late 2006, Gibraltar lawmakers passed the Children and Young Persons (Alcohol, Tobacco and Gaming) Act 2006, which raised the minimum purchase age from 16 to 18 years. But the new law made an exception: minors aged 16 or 17 can purchase and consume beer, wine or cider under 15% ABV on-premise, and pre-packed containers of an alcohol strength not exceeding 5.5% ABV (e.g. alcopops).
 In 2009 France raised its minimum purchase age to 18 years, and fines were increased for selling or serving alcohol to a minor (up to €7,500). Previously, the minimum age was 16 years for off-premise and on-premise purchases of low-alcohol beverages (up to 3% ABV) such as wine, beer, cider, perry, mead, crème de cassis and juices from fermented fruits or vegetables that contain 1.2 to 3° alcohol, natural sweet wines from controlled cultivation and 18 for higher-ABV beverges.
 In October 2009, the government of Malta passed a new law raising its drinking and purchase age from 16 to 17 years.
 In 2010 the Spanish autonomous community of Galicia raised its minimum purchase age from 16 to 18 years.
 In 2011 Denmark passed a law raising the minimum age for off-premise sale of alcohol beverages of >16.5% ABV to 18 years of age. The minimum age to purchase alcohol beverages of <16.5% ABV remains 16.
 In March 2012 Moldova raised the minimum purchase age to 18, from 16 previously.
Italy raised its minimum purchase age from 16 to 18 in 2012. Previously Italy did not have a purchase age for off-premise sales, and the minimum age of 16 years for on-premise sales was not well enforced.
 In 2013 the government of Portugal restricted alcohol sales to young people: distilled spirits cannot be sold to anyone under the age of 18, and other alcohol beverages (e.g. beer, wine, or cider) cannot be sold to anyone under the age of 16. Previously the minimum age for all alcohol beverages was 16 years.
, the minimum legal purchase and consumption age was raised from 16 to 18 in the Netherlands. Previously young people over the age of 16 could purchase and consume alcohol beverages of <15% ABV, and those aged 18 and over could purchase all alcohol beverages.
, the Spanish autonomous community of Asturias raised its drinking age from 16 to 18 years. Asturias was Spain's last community with a drinking age of 16 years. The new law brings the drinking age into line with the rest of Spain, with the exception of Balearic Islands where no purchase age limit is set.
, Portugal harmonized its minimum drinking age to 18 years across all beverage types. Previously the purchase age was 16 years for low-alcohol beverages such as beer, wine or cider.
, Lithuania raised its minimum drinking age from 18 to 20 years.
 From January 2019 the federal states of Austria decided to align their drinking and purchase ages. The states Burgenland, Lower Austria and Vienna therefore raised their age limits for alcohol beverages containing spirits to 18. Prior to 2019 these states had a general drinking and purchase age of 16 years. The sale and consumption of beer, wine and other fermented alcohol beverages is now prohibited to children and young people under the age of 16 years, and the sale and consumption of spirits to minors under the age of 18 years is prohibited throughout Austria.

Oceania

See also 

 Amethyst Initiative
 Alcohol consumption by youth in the United States
 National Minimum Drinking Age Act
 Alcoholism
 National Youth Rights Association
 Shoulder tap (alcohol)
 Foundation for Advancing Alcohol Responsibility
 Choose Responsibility
 Mature minor doctrine
 Youth
 Youth suffrage
 Youth rights
 Age of candidacy
 Legal drinking age controversy (USA)
 Smoking age

References

External links 
 Minimum legal age limits online table updated on a rolling basis, International Alliance for Responsible Drinking

Alcohol law
Drinking culture
Juvenile law
Drinking age
Lists by country
Drinking age